The Mayor of Thames-Coromandel officiates over the Thames-Coromandel District of New Zealand, which is administered by a district council. The office has existed since 1975, when the Thames Borough and the Coromandel County were amalgamated.

Philippa Barribal was the first female mayor when she was elected in 2004. The current Mayor is Len Salt.

List of office holders
There have been nine mayors of Thames-Coromandel. The following is a complete list:

Deputy mayors

References

Thames
Thames-Coromandel
 
Thames-Coromandel District
Thames-Coromandel